Héctor Louis Cruz Dilan (born April 2, 1953) is a former professional baseball outfielder and third baseman. He played in Major League Baseball (MLB) between 1973 and 1982 for four different teams, and played in Nippon Professional Baseball (NPB) in 1983. He is also known by his nickname Heity.

Career
Born in Arroyo, Cruz came from a distinguished baseball family of Puerto Rico. He is the younger brother of former major leaguers José and Tommy Cruz, while his nephew José Cruz Jr. also played in the majors.

Cruz played in the Cardinals minor league system from 1970 through 1973. He debuted with the big team in September 1973, but was demoted to the minors again the following year. In 1975, Cruz won The Sporting News Minor League Player of the Year Award after hitting 29 home runs and 116 RBIs for the Tulsa Oilers of the American Association. He also appeared in 23 games for the Cardinals in 1975, staying with them for three seasons before joining the Chicago Cubs in 1978. He was dealt from the Cubs to the San Francisco Giants for Lynn McGlothen at the trade deadline on June 15, . He also played for the Cincinnati Reds (1979–1980) and finished his major league career back with the Cubs (1981–1982).

In 1976, his first regular season with the Cardinals, Cruz topped the National League rookies with 13 homers and 71 RBIs, but also led the league third basemen with 26 errors. Then he switched to outfield, although he did not play regularly for the rest of his career. In a nine-season career, Cruz was a .225 hitter with 39 home runs and 200 RBIs in 624 games appearances. After that, he played in Japan for the Yomiuri Giants in 1983.

Following his playing retirement, he worked for the United States Postal Service as a mail carrier on the West Side of Chicago. In 2007, Cruz gained induction into the Caribbean Baseball Hall of Fame as part of its 11th class.

See also
 List of Major League Baseball players from Puerto Rico

References

External links

Japanese Baseball Daily
Retrosheet
Caribbean Baseball Hall of Fame – 2007 Inductees (Spanish)

1953 births
Living people
American Association (1902–1997) MVP Award winners
Arkansas Travelers players
Cedar Rapids Cardinals players
Chicago Cubs players
Cincinnati Reds players
Iowa Cubs players
Major League Baseball outfielders
Major League Baseball players from Puerto Rico
Major League Baseball third basemen
Modesto Reds players
Nippon Professional Baseball outfielders
People from Arroyo, Puerto Rico
Puerto Rican expatriate baseball players in Japan
St. Louis Cardinals players
San Francisco Giants players
United States Postal Service people
Yomiuri Giants players